GIF is the Graphics Interchange Format, a bitmap image format.

GIF may also refer to:

Organisations
 Guinee Airlines, a defunct Guinean airline
 Gefle IF, a Swedish football club
 Generation IV International Forum, a body promoting development of new nuclear reactor designs

Places
 Winter Haven's Gilbert Airport (IATA, FAA LID codes), Florida, US
 Gif-sur-Yvette, France

Science and technology
 Metallothionein-3, a protein
 Gastric intrinsic factor, a glycoprotein
 Governance Interoperability Framework

Other uses
 Generation IV International Forum
 Gifford–Inchelium ferry, Washington, US

See also
 Jif (disambiguation)